Ganga Narayan Shrestha (Nepali: गंगानारायण श्रेष्ठ) is Nepalese politician and member of the Bagmati Provincial Assembly from Sindhuli 2 (B). He defeated CPN (Unified Marxist–Leninist) candidate Ram Kumar Poudel by receiving 13,001 votes. He is currently serving as Minister for Internal Affairs and Law of Bagmati Province.

Electoral History

2022 Nepalese provincial elections

References 

Living people
Nepalese activists
21st-century Nepalese politicians
Year of birth missing (living people)
Members of the Provincial Assembly of Bagmati Province